The Somogyi String Quartet was formed in summer of 1997 from ex-students of the Franz Liszt Academy Budapest. Its debut was at the Bartók Memorial House with a program by Beethoven and Bartók. The quartet was invited to the following festivals: Ravinia festival Chicago Quartet festival Radom Poland Festival de Mayo Guadalajara Mexico Viva Vivaldi Mexico DF Hugo Wolf- Days St. Paul Austria Mini Fesztivál Budapest. Concert-series in Hungary and in Europe. Hungaroton has released several CD-s featuring the quartet. These recordings and other recordings of the quartet are regularly broadcast by the Hungarian Radio.

Members
Péter Somogyi -1. violin
György Lendvai- 2. violin
Balázs Tóth -viola
Lászlo Pólus - cello

Discography
https://hungarotonmusic.com/somogyi-vonosnegyes-a4244.html
http://www.bmcrecords.hu/pages/tartalom/index.php?kod=116

Hungarian string quartets